Mihailo Kr. Đorđević (1850–1901) was a Serbian lawyer, politician and diplomat who served as the Minister of Foreign Affairs of the Kingdom of Serbia from 11 February 1891 to 21 March 1892.

Biography 
Mihailo Kr. Đorđević was born in 1850 in Kragujevac which at the time was part of the Principality of Serbia.

He performed the functions of the Minister of Foreign Affairs, the Minister of Justice, the Minister of Internal Affairs, and was also the Deputy Minister of Education of the Kingdom of Serbia. He was a plenipotentiary minister in Paris and Bucharest. He was also a state adviser.

Đorđević died in 1901 in Belgrade.

References 

19th-century Serbian lawyers
Government ministers of Serbia
Serbian diplomats
1850 births
1901 deaths
People from Kragujevac
Foreign ministers of Serbia